Pasteur Crater is a crater in the Arabia quadrangle of Mars, located at 19.4° north latitude and 335.5° west longitude.

Description 

Dark sand dunes are clustered in the southwest of the crater. The orientation of the barchan dunes suggest that they were generated by northeasterly winds. The source of the dune's sand appears to be local. Upwind of the dunes there is a 2-km diameter crater, informally known as Euphrates, within Pasteur crater that may have excavated sediments. The dark sediments have formed a patch at Euphrates' base. HiRISE imagery of the intracrater dunes within Pasteur crater over 1 martian year indicate that the dunes are active with sand movement in a southwesterly direction.

Gallery

References

See also 
 List of craters on Mars

Arabia quadrangle
Impact craters on Mars